Ann Croft is a place in the parish of Hartington Upper Quarter in the Hundred of Wirksworth. A croft is a small enclosed field or pasture near a house.

References

Villages in Derbyshire
Derbyshire Dales